Aquaman is a DC Comics superhero.

Aquaman may also refer to:

Related to the DC Comics character
 Aquaman (film), a 2018 American film
 Aquaman (soundtrack), a soundtrack album from the film
 Aquaman (TV pilot), a 2006 American television pilot
 Aquaman (TV series), a 1967 American television series
 Aquaman: Battle for Atlantis, a 2003 console video game
 Aquaman: Power Wave, an upcoming roller coaster at Six Flags Over Texas

Other uses 
 Aqua Man, a fictional character in the video game Mega Man 8